The Nomans Land Island Wildlife Refuge is a United States National Wildlife Refuge located on Nomans Land, a  island off the coast of Martha's Vineyard in Massachusetts. It is part of the town of Chilmark, in Dukes County. Nomans Land Island was used for aerial gunnery by the U.S. Navy from 1942 to 1996. The United States Fish and Wildlife Service has managed an "overlay" refuge on the Eastern third of the Island under a Joint Management Agreement between the Department of the Interior and Department of the Navy since 1975. Following an extensive surface clearance of ordnance in 1997 and 1998, the Island was transferred to the United States Fish and Wildlife Service to become Nomans Land Island National Wildlife Refuge. It was established " . . . for use as an inviolate sanctuary, or for any other management purpose, for migratory birds" under the Migratory Bird Conservation Act.

Nomans Land Island is surrounded entirely by the Atlantic Ocean. About 30% of the island is wetland which range from emergent marshes to permanently flooded-open water. There are four artificial ponds that were impounded many years ago by early settlers, two large freshwater ponds, and a number of smaller ponds. Common wetland plants include Virginia chain fern, cranberry, sphagnum moss, broad-leaved cattail, and common reed.

Wildlife and habitat
Formal comprehensive surveys of wildlife that use Nomans Land Island NWR have only been conducted for a few years, but a variety of birds, amphibians, reptiles, and invertebrates have been documented on the island, including many state-listed species.

The island especially provides important habitat to many guilds of birds including: seabirds, shorebirds, marshbirds, waterfowl, songbirds, and raptors. During the summer, large numbers of double-crested cormorants, Virginia rails and various songbirds (Savannah sparrows and common yellowthroats) rely on the island for nesting habitat. In addition, Leach's storm-petrels have been confirmed nesting on the Island since 2002 (one of only two sites where this species nests in Massachusetts). During the fall migration, numerous species of raptors (such as peregrine falcons and Cooper's hawks) and neotropical migrants use the island as feeding and resting habitat.

Nomans Land Island Refuge was well forested in the 17th century, but was cleared almost completely during the 19th century for farming and sheep raising, and current vegetation is indicative of a previously forested area. Harsh oceanic winds, salt spray, and lack of shelter have since created a brush, grass, and sedge vegetative complex. Dominant upland vegetation includes rose, poison ivy, bayberry, and arrowwood. Openings created by past fires support grasses and forbs, while areas not affected by fire are dominated by bayberry. Sand dune-beach plant communities along the northern shore include American beachgrass, switchgrass, beardgrass, seaside goldenrod, and beach pea.

External links 
 

Protected areas of Dukes County, Massachusetts
Massachusetts natural resources
National Wildlife Refuges in Massachusetts
Wetlands of Massachusetts
Landforms of Dukes County, Massachusetts
1998 establishments in Massachusetts
Protected areas established in 1998